Sarras may refer to:

 Sarras, a legendary location in the King Arthur legends
 Sarras, Ardèche, a commune in France
 Sarras, Iran

See also
 Saras (disambiguation), including some sites variously written as "Sarras"